Packet Digital LLC, founded in 2003 and headquartered in Fargo, North Dakota, provides engineering services with expertise in power management, system integration, and product development. Packet Digital offers custom battery and charger design and assembly in the US. Packet Digital developed an autonomous power management system to achieve significant power savings. Their architecture is flexible and portable across multiple applications.

Unmanned Aircraft Systems (UAS) 

Packet Digital designs circuitry for solar-powered UAS to more efficiently use electrical output from solar panels on the aircraft wings and fuselage to power avionics and charge batteries, to increase flight times.

Packet Digital is designing power electronics to be used conjointly with advanced photovoltaics being developed by the United States Naval Research Laboratory, Washington, D.C., with the aim of producing solar-powered UAS with unlimited flight time. The circuitry will use power tracking algorithms to accommodate movements of the unmanned aerial vehicle (UAV) or clouds that could change how much sunlight is available to the solar cells.

Packet Digital announced in June 2015 that it would create Botlink LLC as a joint venture with drone app developer Aerobotic Innovations LLC. Botlink will develop and market a hardware-software platform combining Packet Digital's power management circuits for improved drone endurance and Aerobotic Innovation's Internet cloud-based operations platform for safety, communications, data processing and control of a drone from a drag-and-drop app on a tablet or smartphone—a feature known as "Drag. Drop. Drone."

In 2021, Packet Digital and the US Naval Research Laboratory (NRL) announced the successful first test flight of their jointly developed long-endurance UAS. The fixed-wing, hybrid UAS utilized solar panels installed on the wings, autonomous soaring algorithms, and hydrogen fuel cell technology to create a new class of small UAS with the ability to stay in flight for over two days. The fixed-wing drone successfully completed the first phase of operational testing at the Aberdeen Proving Ground in Maryland in late November.

Additionally in 2021, Packet Digital was awarded a supplier agreement with Lockheed Martin to supply high energy density, lithium batteries for Lockheed Martin's cutting-edge Indago 4 drone. Packet Digital's Indago 4 battery has significantly better performance and functionality than earlier Indago batteries. The battery management system enhances the safety and longevity of the battery, reducing cost of ownership. Packet Digital has also developed a multi-pack field charger that can be operated on either AC or DC.

Space power systems 

In 2021, Packet Digital was awarded a US$7,999,913 contract by the Air Force Research Laboratory to develop highly-efficient and reliable space power components for future U.S. space missions. Work began in July 2021, and is expected to be completed in 2024. Packet Digital's development focuses on replacing current spacecraft power system hardware, which is reaching its technological limit in regards to power density and efficiency. Power system hardware size and weight can be dramatically reduced by implementing advanced technologies.

Leadership 
In February 2015, it was announced Peter Lindgren, president and CEO of Otter Products, and Linda Pancratz, retired chairman of the board and CEO of TDL Infomedia Limited in the United Kingdom, joined the Packet Digital board of directors.

 Packet Digital was led by Terri Zimmerman (CEO), who was named CEO in 2013. CTO Andrew Paulsen joined Packet Digital in 2005.

Accolades 
Packet Digital was named the Electronics and Overall Innovation Challenge Winner at Aviation Week 2012 in Washington, D.C. Gartner named Packet Digital in its 2014 Cool Vendors in Semiconductors report. Inc. listed the company number 468 among its 500 Fastest Growing Companies in 2008.

References 

Companies based in Fargo–Moorhead
Semiconductor companies of the United States
Technology companies established in 2003